William "Billy" J. Williams (birth unknown – death unknown) was a Welsh professional rugby league footballer who played in the 1900s.

International honours
Billy Williams won 4 caps for Wales in 1908–10 while at Halifax.

References

Halifax R.L.F.C. players
Place of birth missing
Place of death missing
Rugby league wingers
Wales national rugby league team players
Welsh rugby league players
Year of birth missing
Year of death missing